Proagoderus pactolus, is a species of dung beetle found in India and Sri Lanka.

Description
This narrowly oval, convex species has an average length of about 11 to 16 mm. Body bright deep metallic green. Sides of the prothorax, parts of the head are reddish-golden. Elytra reddish-orange, with greenish suture whereas antenna pale yellow. Head, legs, and ventrum covered with moderately long yellow setae. Pronotum and elytra covered with minute yellow setae. Head, pronotum, and elytra densely punctured or granular. Elytra very minutely and evenly. Pronotum smooth and shiny at the middle. Pronotum long, with nearly straight sides. Elytra feebly striate, with carinate juxtasutural intervals. Pygidium densely punctured. Male has semicircular clypeus and a slender horn on vertex. Pronotum with a slight tubercle on each side. Female has a little produced clypeus with a strongly arcuate frontal carina.

References 

Scarabaeinae
Insects of India
Beetles of Sri Lanka
Insects described in 1787